Oinofyta railway station is a small station on the Piraeus–Platy railway line in the village of Oinofyta in Boeotia, Central Greece. It is situated on the Piraeus–Platy railway. It is owned by OSE, but service are provided by TrainOSE, through the Athens Suburban Railway from Athens to Chalcis.

History
The station was opened on 27 October 1983 when the line was upgraded. The line was converted to diesel sometime before 1990. Freight traffic declined sharply when the state-imposed monopoly of OSE for the transport of agricultural products and fertilisers ended in the early 1990s. Many small stations of the network with little passenger traffic were closed down. In 2001 the infrastructure element of OSE was created, known as GAIAOSE; it would henceforth be responsible for the maintenance of stations, bridges and other elements of the network, as well as the leasing and the sale of railway assists. In 2003, OSE launched "Proastiakos SA", as a subsidiary to serve the operation of the suburban network in the urban complex of Athens during the 2004 Olympic Games. In 2005, TrainOSE was created as a brand within OSE to concentrate on rail services and passenger interface. In 2008, all Athens Suburban Railway services were transferred from OSE to TrainOSE. The station was reopened on 6 May 2005. In 2009, with the Greek debt crisis unfolding OSE's Management was forced to reduce services across the network. Timetables were cutback and routes closed, as the government-run entity attempted to reduce overheads. In 2017 OSE's passenger transport sector was privatised as TrainOSE, currently a wholly-owned subsidiary of Ferrovie dello Stato Italiane infrastructure, including stations, remained under the control of OSE. That same year on 30 July Line 3 of the Athens Suburban Railway began serving the station.

Facilities
The ground-level station is located within a small cutting and is assessed via stairs or a ramp. It has 2 side platforms, with the main station buildings located on the eastbound platform; however, due to state funding issues the booking office is closed; however, waiting shelters are available. There is no cafe or shop on-site. At platform level, there are sheltered seating but no Dot-matrix display departure or arrival screens; however, timetable poster boards on both platforms are available. There is no car park or bus connections at the station.

Services

Since 15 May 2022, the following weekday services call at this station:

References

External links
 Oinofyta railway station - National Railway Network Greek Travel Pages

Boeotia
Buildings and structures in Boeotia
Transport in Boeotia
Railway stations in Central Greece
Railway stations opened in 1983